Tennys Sandgren II (born July 22, 1991) is an American professional tennis player. He has achieved a career-high ATP singles ranking of No. 41 on January 14, 2019. He broke into the top 100 of the ATP rankings toward the end of 2017 after competing mainly on the ATP Challenger Tour. Born and raised in Gallatin, Tennessee, he played two years of college tennis at the University of Tennessee before launching his professional career.

Early life
Sandgren's parents, South African Lia Lourens and American David Sandgren, met at a tennis club in Johannesburg. They married and moved to Tennessee in 1988 with Sandgren's older brother, Davey.

Sandgren, who was named Tennys after his Swedish great-grandfather, was home-schooled and is coached by his mother.

Davey Sandgren is also a tennis player who achieved a career-high ATP ranking of 800 in doubles in 2009

Junior career
As a junior, Sandgren compiled a singles win–loss record of 70–38 (and 53–35 in doubles), reaching as high as No. 9 in the combined ITF junior world rankings in April 2009.

Junior majors

Australian Open: – 
French Open: 3R (2009)
Wimbledon: 2R (2009)
US Open: 2R (2009)

College career
Sandgren was a January midseason addition to the Tennessee Volunteers' 2010 tennis roster, joining older brother, Davey, who was a senior All-American on the team. Coached by Sam Winterbotham and Chris Woodruff, the younger Sandgren immediately strengthened the middle of the Vols' singles lineup, going 10–0 in Southeastern Conference play at the No. 4 position to help the team win the SEC regular-season and tournament titles. The team reached the NCAA team finals that year.

As a sophomore, Sandgren reached the semifinals of the NCAA Singles Championships, losing to teammate, roommate and doubles partner Rhyne Williams in three sets. He finished the season with a 37–6 record and his 10–1 record in conference helped the Vols to an SEC regular-season title. He finished his career with a 60–12 singles record (83.33 percent), the third-best career winning percentage in Tennessee history.

He was also a member of the USTA Summer Collegiate Team after his freshman and sophomore seasons.

Professional career

2011–2016: Early years, Futures success and first Challenger title

Sandgren turned professional in 2011, playing mostly at the ITF Futures level through 2012. In 2013, his ATP ranking remained inside the top 300 for nearly the entire year, allowing him to play on the Challenger Tour for much of the season. In his final tournament of the year, Sandgren won his first final at Challenger level in Champaign to crack the Top 200 for the first time.

In 2014, Sandgren missed half of the year after undergoing hip surgery near the beginning of the season. Upon returning to the court, it took him nearly a year to get back to the Top 250 and the Challenger level. Sandgren returned to the Top 200 in November 2016, when he reached his second career Challenger final in Columbus, almost three years after he first achieved these two milestones.

2017: Challenger Tour breakthrough, top 100
In 2017, Sandgren reached five Challenger finals, winning two of them in Tempe and Savannah. He qualified for his first tournament on the ATP World Tour, the U.S. Men's Clay Court Championships in Houston. Sandgren's success earned him a wildcard berth into the main draw of the French Open. In his Grand Slam debut, Sandgren lost in the first round to Mikhail Kukushkin. A semifinals appearance in Prostejov helped him to break into the top 100. He recorded his first two ATP World Tour wins at the Washington Open in early August, including a victory over No. 20 Nick Kyrgios. At the U.S. Open, Sandgren lost in the first round to No. 7 Marin Cilic.

2018: Australian Open quarterfinal, maiden ATP final and top 50 debut

Sandgren began the 2018 season with a first-round loss to Gilles Simon in Pune. He followed with a loss to Casper Ruud in the second qualifying round at the Auckland Open. Sandgren received entry into the main draw of the tournament as a lucky loser following the withdrawal of Kyle Edmund. In the first round of the main draw, he lost in three sets to Hyeon Chung, winner of the inaugural Next Generation ATP Finals in Milan, Italy, two months prior. Making his Australian Open main draw debut, Sandgren won his opening match against French player Jeremy Chardy. In the second round, he defeated 2014 champion and ninth seed Stan Wawrinka, marking his first victory against a Top 10 ranked player. Following a victory over Maximilian Marterer in the third round, Sandgren defeated world No. 5 Dominic Thiem in Sandgren’s first five-set match. He lost to Chung in the quarterfinals in straight sets.

In the run up to the quarterfinal he was involved in controversy when he was publicly criticized by Serena Williams for making anti-LGBTQ comments. 

As the No. 1 seed, Sandgren was defeated in the first round of qualification for the Argentina Open by world No. 188 Facundo Bagnis. He lost in the second round of the Rio Open, the first round of the Brasil Open, the second round in Indian Wells and the first round in Miami.

At the beginning of the clay season, Sandgren reached his first final on the ATP World Tour at the U.S. Men's Clay Court Championships, but lost to Steve Johnson. He entered the top 50 reaching a career-high of World No. 47 on April 16, 2018.

Sandgren lost in the first round of the Monte Carlo Open to Philipp Kohlschreiber in straight sets. He suffered another first-round loss in Barcelona to Malek Jaziri, also in straight sets. Following a first-round loss against Frances Tiafoe at the Estoril Open, Sandgren suffered his fourth consecutive first round loss, losing in straight sets to Denis Shapovalov at the Madrid Open. After having reached the quarterfinals at the Geneva Open, Sandgren was knocked out in the first round of the French Open by world No. 177 Hubert Hurkacz. He lost in the first round of the doubles tournament in straight sets.

In the first round of Wimbledon, Sandgren was knocked out by eventual champion Novak Djokovic in straight sets, winning only six games.

In the first round of the U.S. Open, Sandgren beat Viktor Troicki in straight sets before losing to Djokovic in four sets in the second round.

2019: First ATP title

In January, Sandgren won his maiden ATP Tour title at the Auckland Open. He achieved his career high in the singles rankings at World No. 41 on January 14, 2019. However, after the title, Sandgren suffered a 9-match tour-level losing streak, which he finally snapped at Wimbledon, where he reached the fourth round before losing to Sam Querrey. He then reached the quarterfinals at Newport and the third round at the US Open. At the end of the season, a fractured toe kept him inactive, and his ranking sank back out of the top 50.

2020: Second Australian Open quarterfinal, top 50 year-end ranking
Sandgren again made it to the quarterfinals of the 2020 Australian Open, where he lost in five tight sets against Roger Federer, after having seven match points.

2021: Loss of form, out of top 50, Olympics debut
Having tested positive for COVID-19 in November 2020, Sandgren returned the same result in January 2021, but was deemed to be "non-infectious" and was allowed entry into Australia to compete in the Australian Open where he lost in the first round.

Sandgren qualified to represent the United States at the 2020 Summer Olympics. He lost in the first round in singles but reached the semifinals in doubles partnering Austin Krajicek where they lost to eventual champions Mate Pavić and Nikola Mektić. The pair lost subsequently in the bronze medal match to the New Zealand pair of Marcus Daniell and Michael Venus.

2022: Missed Australian Open due to vaccine mandate, out of top 400

Sandgren opted not to participate in the 2022 Australian Open due to the Australian Federal Government's COVID-19 vaccine mandate for visitors to Australia. When Novak Djokovic had his Australian visa rescinded upon arrival to play in the tournament, Sandgren's comment on Twitter in response to the Victorian state government's position on the matter was "LOL trusting the science again".

Performance timelines

Singles 
Current through the 2022 ATP Tour.

Doubles

Olympic medal matches

Doubles: 1 (4th place)

ATP career finals

Singles: 2 (1 title, 1 runner-up)

Doubles: 1 (1 runner-up)

ATP Challengers and ITF Futures finals

Singles: 27 (15–12)

Doubles: 27 (18–9)

Record against top 10 players
Sandgren's match record against players who have been ranked in the top 10 (former #1 in bold). Only ATP Tour main-draw matches are considered.

  Fabio Fognini 2–2
  Matteo Berrettini 1–0
  Lucas Pouille 1–0
  Dominic Thiem 1–0
  Jo-Wilfried Tsonga 1–0
  Stan Wawrinka 1–0
  Félix Auger-Aliassime 1–1
  Hubert Hurkacz 1–1
  Andy Murray 1–1
  Cameron Norrie 1–1
  Gilles Simon 1–2
  Roberto Bautista Agut 0–1
  Pablo Carreño Busta 0–1
  Marin Čilić 0–1
  Grigor Dimitrov 0–1
  Roger Federer 0–1
  Diego Schwartzman 0–1
  Janko Tipsarević 0–1
  David Ferrer 0–2
  John Isner 0–2
  Andrey Rublev 0–2
  Casper Ruud 0–2
  Denis Shapovalov 0–2
  Alexander Zverev 0–2
  Novak Djokovic 0–4

*

Top 10 wins
 He has a  record against players who were, at the time the match was played, ranked in the top 10.

World TeamTennis
Sandgren has played two seasons with World TeamTennis starting in 2015 when he debuted in the league with the California Dream and then again in 2018 with the Washington Kastles. It was announced that he will join the Orlando Storm during the 2020 season set to begin July 12.

Sandgren posted a 9–6 singles record throughout the season, posting a winning percentage (games won-lost) of 53%, the second-highest in the league. He also paired up with Ken Skupski in men's doubles as well as Jessica Pegula in mixed doubles to help the Storm earn a No. 3 seed in the WTT Playoffs. The Storm would ultimately fall to the Chicago Smash in the semifinals.

Notes

References

External links
 
 
 
 

1991 births
Living people
American male tennis players
Tennis people from Tennessee
People from Gallatin, Tennessee
People from Wesley Chapel, Florida
American people of South African descent
American people of Swedish descent
American Christians
American conspiracy theorists
Tennessee Volunteers men's tennis players
Tennis players at the 2020 Summer Olympics
Olympic tennis players of the United States